Ochrosia brownii, synonym Neisosperma brownii, is a species of plant in the family Apocynaceae. It was endemic to the Marquesas Islands in French Polynesia and is extinct in the wild.

References

brownii
Flora of the Marquesas Islands
Extinct flora of Oceania
Plant extinctions since 1500
Taxonomy articles created by Polbot